Ugly and Proud is the second studio album by New York hardcore punk band Sheer Terror. It was released in 1992 on Magnetic Air.

Track list

References

1991 albums
Sheer Terror albums